Köprülü may refer to:

People
 Köprülü family (Kypriljotet), an Ottoman noble family of Albanian origin
 Köprülü era (1656–1703), the period in which the Ottoman Empire's politics were set by the Grand Viziers, mainly the Köprülü family
 Köprülü Mehmed Pasha (1575–1661), Ottoman statesman, founder of the Köprülü family
 Köprülü Fazıl Ahmed Pasha (1635–1676), Ottoman statesman
 Köprülü Fazıl Mustafa Pasha (1637–1691), Ottoman statesman
 Amcazade Köprülü Hüseyin Pasha (1644–1702), Ottoman statesman
 Köprülü Numan Pasha (died 1719), Ottoman statesman
 Köprülü Abdullah Pasha (died 1735), Ottoman general
 Mehmet Fuat Köprülü (1890–1966), Turkish politician and historian
 Murat Köprülü, American chief executive

Places
 Veles, North Macedonia, known as Köprülü until the Balkan Wars
 Köprülü, Göle, a town in the district of Göle, Ardahan Province of Turkey
 Köprülü, Ceyhan, a village in the district of Ceyhan, Adana Province, Turkey
 Köprülü, Gündoğmuş, a village in the district of Gündoğmuş, Antalya Province, Turkey
 Köprülü, Şavşat, a village in the district of Şavşat, Artvin Province, Turkey
 Köprülü Canyon, a canyon and a national park in Antalya Province, Turkey

Other
 Koprulu Sector, a fictional sector in space in the StarCraft universe